Ko Jun (born Kim Joon-ho on 8 December 1978) is a South Korean actor.

Filmography

Film

Television series

Web series

Variety shows

Awards and nominations

References

External links 
 

 

1978 births
Living people
People from Seoul
Male actors from Seoul
21st-century South Korean male actors
South Korean male film actors
South Korean male television actors